{{Infobox cheese
| name          = Ragusano
| image         = Ragusano Cheese.jpg
| alt           = 
| caption       = 
| othernames    = 
| country       = Italy
| region        = Sicily
| town          = 
| source        = Modicana cow's milk
| pasteurised   = 
| texture       = 
| fat           = 
| protein       = 
| dimensions    = 
| weight        = 
| aging         = 
| certification = DOC 1955DOP 1995
}}

Ragusano is an Italian cow's-milk cheese produced in Ragusa, in Sicily in southern Italy. It is a firm stretched-curd cheese made with whole milk from cows of the Modicana breed, raised exclusively on fresh grass or hay in the provinces of Ragusa and Syracuse.

The cheese was awarded Italian Denominazione di Origine Controllata'' protection in 1955 and EU DOP status in 1995.

See also
 List of stretch-cured cheeses

References

Italian cheeses
Cuisine of Sicily
Italian products with protected designation of origin
Cheeses with designation of origin protected in the European Union
Sheep's-milk cheeses
Stretched-curd cheeses
Ark of Taste foods